The 1989–90 National Football League, known for sponsorship reasons as the Royal Liver Assurance National Football League, was the 59th staging of the National Football League (NFL), an annual Gaelic football tournament for the Gaelic Athletic Association county teams of Ireland.

The tournament introduced several experimental rules: game divided into four quarters; all kick outs from the hands from within the small rectangle; free kicks from the hands or the ground; all sideline kicks from the hands; teeing up the ball is a foul. Of these rules, only the free kick from hand or ground, and the illegality of teeing up the ball, survive to the modern day. Meath defeated Down in the final.

Format

Divisions
 Division One: 8 teams
 Division Two: 8 teams
 Division Three: 16 teams. Split into two regional groups of 8 (North and South)

Round-robin format
Each team played every other team in its division (or group where the division is split) once, either home or away.

Points awarded
2 points were awarded for a win and 1 for a draw.

Titles
Teams in all three divisions competed for the National Football League title.

Knockout stage qualifiers
 Division One: top 4 teams
 Division Two: top 2 teams
 Division Three (North):  group winners
 Division Three (South):  group winners

Knockout phase structure
In the quarter-finals, the match-ups were as follows:
 Quarter-final 1: First-placed team in Division One v First-placed team in Division Three (South)
 Quarter-final 2: Second-placed team in Division One v First-placed team in Division Three (North)
 Quarter-final 3: Third-placed team in Division One v Second-placed team in Division Two
 Quarter-final 4: Fourth-placed team in Division One v First-placed team in Division Two
The semi-final match-ups are:
 Semi-final 1: Winner Quarter-final 1 v Winner Quarter-final 4
 Semi-final 2: Winner Quarter-final 2 v Winner Quarter-final 3

The final match-up is: Winner Semi-final 1 v Winner Semi-final 2.

Promotion and relegation

 Division One: bottom 2 teams demoted to Division Two
 Division Two: top 2 teams promoted to Division One. Bottom 3 teams demoted to Division Three.
 Division Three (North): group winners promoted to Division Two. Group runners up play-off for the third promotion slot from Division Three.
 Division Three (South):  group winners promoted to Division Two. Group runners up play-off for the third promotion slot from Division Three.

Separation of teams on equal points

In the event that teams finish on equal points, then a play-off will be used to determine group placings if necessary, i.e. where to decide relegation places or quarter-finalists.

League Tables

Division One

Play-offs

Table

Division Two

Second Place play-offs

Table

Division Three

Division Three (North) play-offs

Division Three (South) play-offs

Division Three Promotion play-offs

Division Three (North) table

Division Three (South) table

Knockout stages

Quarter-finals

Semi-finals

Final

References

External links

National Football League
National Football League
National Football League (Ireland) seasons